The Berne International was a Socialist International formed in Berne, Switzerland 3–9 February 1919. Its goal was to re-establish the Second International. However it did not support world revolution and rejected involvement with the Communist International.

The initiative grew out of the failure of a group of social democratic parties to hold a conference in Stockholm in 1917.

Hjalmar Branting rejected any role for the dictatorship of the proletariat arguing it could not lead to socialism. Karl Kautsky and Eduard Bernstein urged the conference to condemn the Bolsheviks and their seizure of power in Russia. Branting moved a resolution which supported the ideology of bourgeois democracy and greeted the revolution in Soviet Russia, but which also denounced the dictatorship of the proletariat. Whilst this gained much support, a group of delegates led by Friedrich Adler and Jean Longuet proposed a resolution calling on the conference to avoid taking a definite stand on Soviet Russia, as there was a lack of information about the situation there. To remedy this they proposed that a commission should be sent to Russia to study the economic and political situation there so that the question of Bolshevism could be discussed at the next Congress. 

The commission was to be led by Adler, Kautsky, and Rudolf Hilferding. The Soviet regime agreed to admit the commission, but in return requested the admittance of the Soviet commission to those countries whose representatives were on the Berne commission. The Soviet government received no reply to this request and the commission proposed at the conference never visited Russia.

See also 
 International Socialist Commission

References 

Defunct socialist parties in Switzerland
Political history of Switzerland
20th century in Bern
1919 in Switzerland
Political parties established in 1919
Former member parties of the Socialist International